Indira Sheumaker is a politician and activist currently serving as Ward 1 City Council Member for Des Moines, Iowa. She is the youngest member on the Des Moines City Council.

Early life
Sheumaker was born in Des Moines to a Black American mother and a white American father. She was named in honor of Indira Gandhi. She graduated from Herbert Hoover High School. She was active in theatre while attending Iowa State University.

In 2020, felony charges were brought against Sheumaker related to her participation in a July 1, 2020, protest against felony disenfranchisement at the Iowa State Capitol. Police alleged that Sheumaker assaulted a police officer and interfered with official acts causing serious injury. She faced an additional serious misdemeanor for allegedly assaulting another police officer. In May 2021, felony charges were dropped against Sheumaker after she accepted an agreement with the state pleading guilty to aggravated misdemeanor assault of a police officer. All other charges against Sheumaker were dropped. On June 30, 2022, two Des Moines police officers filed an assault lawsuit against six protesters, including Sheumaker.

Career
Prior to running for office, Sheumaker was involved as an activist with Des Moines' Black Liberation Movement. It was through her social justice activism and involvement in council meetings at the Des Moines City Council that Sheumaker decided to run for political office. She attended her first city council meeting in 2020 to advocate for an ordinance banning racial profiling.

Des Moines City Council 
On 2 November 2021, Sheumaker ousted the two-term incumbent Ward 1 councilman Bill Gray. The race was non-partisan. Sheumaker received 46% of votes, while Gray received 36% of votes. Sheumaker has no previous experience with electoral politics. Her platform included defunding the police, decriminalization of marijuana, food security, affordable housing, the municipalization of city utilities, decentralization of power, and wealth redistribution. She was sworn into office on January 10, 2022.

See also
Black Lives Matter
Defund the police

References

External links
Indira 2021 website
Indira Sheumaker Won in Iowa on Defunding the Police

21st-century American politicians
African-American city council members
African-American people in Iowa politics
African-American women in politics
American community activists
Black Lives Matter people
Iowa Democrats
People from Des Moines, Iowa
Women city councillors in Iowa
Living people
21st-century American women politicians
1994 births